Bernd Böhlich (born 25 April 1957) is a German film director. He has directed more than thirty films since 1983.

Selected filmography
Landschaft mit Dornen (1992, TV film)
Deadly Silence (1996, TV film)
 (2001, TV film)
Du bist nicht allein (2007)
The Moon and Other Lovers (2008)
 (2012)
 (2018)

References

External links 

1957 births
Living people
Mass media people from Saxony
People from Löbau